Natalie Gruzlewski (born 1977) is an Australian television presenter.

Career
Gruzlewski studied journalism at Griffith University after finishing school. Her career began on the Gold Coast as host of Prime Television's Surf TV, a beach and surf conditions program. In 1999, she joined the Nine Network as weather presenter on the network's Nine Gold Coast News bulletin. She acquired a national identity as 'Lady Luck' on The NRL Footy Show in 2002–2003. In 2004, Gruzlewski joined Nine Network's travel program Getaway as a full-time presenter. She has also hosted the reality series The Farmer Wants a Wife.

In October 2009, she filled in on Weekend Today while Leila McKinnon was on holidays. In February 2010, she was appointed weather presenter on Nine News Sydney from Monday to Thursday; she also filed lifestyle and entertainment reports for Nine News. In September 2013, Gruzlewski was appointed as weather presenter on Nine Gold Coast News replacing Paul Burt. In October 2014, she resigned from the Nine Network.

Personal life

Gruzlewski is of Polish descent and grew up on the Gold Coast, Queensland. In 2009, she married former professional surfer Luke Egan; however, after two years of marriage, they separated. In May 2012, Gruzlewski announced that she was engaged to property developer Jack Ray and in October she was pregnant with her first child. In November 2012, Gruzlewski married Jack Ray in a private ceremony. She gave birth to daughter in 2013.

References

External links

Nine News presenters
Living people
Australian people of Polish descent
1977 births
People from the Gold Coast, Queensland
Griffith University alumni